The official language of Guinea-Bissau is Portuguese, which is spoken by 11% of the population. The local dialect is called Crioulo or Kiriol.  French is also learned in schools, as Guinea-Bissau is surrounded by French-speaking countries and is a full member of the Francophonie as well as the Lusophone CPLP.

Native languages 
Guinea-Bissau Creole is spoken by 69% of the population.

Native languages include Balanta, Fula, Mandjak, Mandinka, Jola, and Papel.

References

Further reading

External links 
 Ethnologue.com report on languages of Guinea-Bissau
 PanAfriL10n page on Guinea-Bissau
 tlfq.ulaval.ca